Kearney Township may refer to:

 Kearney Township, Michigan
 Kearney Township, Clay County, Missouri